Alice in Thunderdome is the third studio album by American hip hop artist Rob Sonic. It was released on OK-47 Records on August 26, 2014.

Music 
Alice in Thunderdome is the first Rob Sonic album to feature producers other than Sonic. Production contributors are Aesop Rock and Edison. Guest appearances include rappers Aesop Rock and Breeze Brewin.

Track listing

References

External links 
 Alice In Thunderdome at Bandcamp
 Alice In Thunderdome at Discogs

2014 albums
Rob Sonic albums